Furukawa (古川 or 古河, both meaning "old river") may refer to:

People
Furukawa (surname)

Places
 Furukawa, Gifu, a former town merged into the city of Hida, Gifu
Furukawa, Miyagi, city located in Miyagi, Japan
Furukawa Station, JR East railway station located in Ōsaki, Miyagi Prefecture, Japan
Hida-Furukawa Station, JR Central railway station located in Hida, Gifu Prefecture, Japan
Nishi-Furukawa Station, JR East railway station located in Ōsaki, Miyagi Prefecture, Japan

Business
Furukawa Co.
Furukawa Electric,a Japanese electric and electronics equipment company

Other
JEF United Ichihara Chiba, JR East and Furukawa Electric United